The AACTA International Award for Best Supporting Actress is an accolade given by the Australian Academy of Cinema and Television Arts (AACTA), a non-profit organisation whose aim is to "identify, award, promote, and celebrate Australia's greatest achievements in film and television". The award is presented at the annual AACTA International Awards, which rewards achievements in feature films, regardless of the country the film was made. The winners and nominees are determined by the international chapter of the Academy, which comprises eighty members of Australian film-makers and executives. It was first handed out by the Academy in 2013 (for films released in 2012) as a discretionary prize, with Jacki Weaver being the first recipient.

Winners and nominees
In the following table, the years listed correspond to the year of film release; the ceremonies are held the following year. The actress in bold and in dark blue background have received a special award; those in bold and in yellow background have won a regular competitive award. Those that are neither highlighted nor in bold are the nominees. When sorted chronologically, the table always lists the winning actress first, and then the other nominees.

2010s

2020s

See also
 AACTA Awards
 AACTA Award for Best Actress in a Supporting Role

References

External links
 The Australian Academy of Cinema and Television Arts official website

A
AACTA Award winners
Film awards for supporting actress